Scott Schroer, better known by his stage name Scotty Boy, is an American DJ and record producer, based in Los Angeles. Two of his songs have peaked at number one on the Billboard Dance Club Songs chart.

Early life and career 

Schroer started DJing at the age of 14 when he would perform at school and local club gigs. The name 'Scotty Boy' was from when a club owner addressed him as that and it eventually became his stage name. In 2017, he released the song "Shine Your Love" with singer Lizzie Curious.

Discography

Charted singles

Extended plays 
 2020: Used to Be Like That [Darklight Recordings]

Other singles 
 2019: "Do You Realize" (featuring Luca Debonaire) [Sirup Music]
 2019: "Phonky" [Which Bottle?]
 2019: "Lost in the Groove (with Lizzie Curious) [Which Bottle?]
 2019: "Manos Parriba" (with Luca Debonaire) [Which Bottle?]
 2019: "Saltillo" [Sirup Music]
 2019: "Party Queen" [Erase Records]
 2019: "Surrender My Soul" (with Da Funk Junkies) [Which Bottle?]
 2019: "All for You" (with Alexander Orue and Melody Smith) [Which Bottle?]
 2020: "What People Say" [Sirup Music]
 2020: "Move to the Beat" [Darklight Recordings]
 2020: "The Beat" [Sirup Music]

References 

American DJs
American electronic musicians
Living people
People from Los Angeles
Electronic dance music DJs
Year of birth missing (living people)